Alexander Plantation House, also known as Lanark Farm, and Alexander's Plantation, is a former tobacco plantation and plantation house located near Midway in Woodford County, Kentucky.

It was listed on the National Register of Historic Places on June 23, 1983, for historical, architectural, and engineering significance. The house is a five-bay two-story central hall plan stone house. The house consists of two early stone houses, which were moved in c. 1935 –1936 about a mile to the current location.

References

External links
Photos of Alexander Plantation House

Houses on the National Register of Historic Places in Kentucky
Federal architecture in Kentucky
Houses in Woodford County, Kentucky
Plantation houses in Kentucky
National Register of Historic Places in Woodford County, Kentucky
Central-passage houses
Relocated buildings and structures in Kentucky
Stone houses in Kentucky